Hawaiian Eye is an American detective television series that ran from October 1959 to April 1963 on the ABC television network.

Premise
Private investigator Tracy Steele (Anthony Eisley) and his half-Hawaiian partner, Tom Lopaka (Robert Conrad), own Hawaiian Eye, a combination detective agency and private security firm, located in Honolulu, Hawaii. Their principal client is the Hawaiian Village Hotel, which in exchange for security services, provides the agency with a luxurious private compound on the hotel grounds. The partners investigate mysteries and protect clients with the sometime help of photographer Cricket Blake (Connie Stevens), who also sings at the hotel's Shell Bar, and a ukulele-playing cab driver Kim Quisado (Poncie Ponce), who has connections throughout the islands.  Engineer turned detective Greg McKenzie (Grant Williams), joins the agency later on as a full partner, while hotel social director Philip Barton (Troy Donahue) lends a hand after Tracy Steele departs.

Background and run
Hawaiian Eye was one of several ABC/Warner Bros. Television detective series of the era situated in different exotic locales.  Others included  Hollywood-based 77 Sunset Strip; Bourbon Street Beat, set in New Orleans; and Miami's Surfside 6. In reality, all were shot on the Warner Bros. backlot in Burbank, Calif. making it easy for characters—and sometimes whole scripts—to cross over.   Although the shows are not spin-offs in the traditional sense, Sunset was the first in this chain of "exotic location detective series".  In this regard, Hawaiian Eye was the most viable of the Sunset look-alikes, lasting four seasons.  The show's debut coincided with several real-world developments that helped contribute to its longevity. These were the granting of statehood to Hawaii, the advent of mass tourism to the new state brought about by the introduction of jetliners for commercial passenger flights, and the promotional efforts of Henry J. Kaiser, whose real-estate projects in Honolulu included building the hotel complex originally known as Kaiser's Hawaiian Village (later the Hilton Hawaiian Village Hotel).

The program did well in the ratings on Wednesday evenings against NBC and Perry Como's Kraft Music Hall. In its last season, it was placed on the Tuesday schedule opposite CBS's The Red Skelton Show and a new NBC Western drama Empire set on a modern New Mexico ranch. Skelton survived the competition, and Empire was cut to a half-hour program called Redigo the following season, and was soon cancelled. The third-season episodes were preceded in the 8:30 pm (Eastern) time slot by the popular Hanna-Barbera cartoon series, Top Cat.

Cast

The series regulars, who were shown during the opening credits, are listed below in the order in which they debuted during the show's four-year run.

Recurring characters

 Lt. Danny Quon, played by Mel Prestidge, was the Hawaiian Eye's main contact with the Honolulu Police Department.
 Moke, played by Douglas Mossman, was the chief uniformed security officer for Hawaiian Eye. He went by several variant names in the first season before the writers finally settled on one.
 Paul, played by Andre Philippe, was the master of ceremonies at the Shell Bar in the Hawaiian Village Hotel.
 Bert, played by Sam Rawlins, was the doorman at the Hawaiian Village Hotel.
 Teo, played by several actors including Ralph Hanalei and Keone, was a uniformed security guard for the Hawaiian Eye agency.
 Roy Hondine, played by Rush Williams, was a columnist for a major Honolulu newspaper.
 Sunny Day, played by Tina Cole, was a singer at the Shell Bar. The role was created after Connie Stevens temporarily left the series in the fourth season over a contract dispute.
 Sgt. Alika, played by Makee K. Blaisdell, was a detective for the Hilo police force and appeared in several episodes that took place on the big island of Hawaii.
 Bubbles Smith, played by Karen Griffin, was a temporary girlfriend of Tom Lopaka in several second-season episodes.

Guest musical acts
All of the Warner Bros. detective shows of this era featured a musical interlude, generally performed by a series regular. On occasion, Hawaiian Eye had a guest act perform:

 Sterling Mossman and his Barefoot Bar Gang:  A real policeman by day, Sterling also performed nights at the Barefoot Bar, one of Honolulu's most popular tourist attractions from 1952–1969.
 Arthur Lyman and his exotic tropical sounds: In one episode, "An Echo of Honor," Connie Stevens sang a version of the title song accompanied by Lyman's group.

Legacy
Hawaiian Eye would become the precursor in a long list of other crime action-drama detective and police procedural television shows based in and around Hawaii, including Hawaii Five-O and its reboot series, Magnum, P.I. and its reboot series, Hawaiian Heat, One West Waikiki, Hawaii and NCIS: Hawai'i.

In other media
A limited amount of spin-off material accompanied the series.  Gold Key published a single comic book, Hawaiian Eye #1, in 1963, which detailed an adventure of Cricket and Phil Barton.  In 1962, a single novelization by Frank Castle also appeared on bookshelves in America.

A Warner Bros. Music record of the show featured some songs performed by Stevens and Robert Conrad, a rerecording of the title song and some Warner stock music.

In popular culture
 The series was parodied in a 1962 episode of The Flintstones in Season Three's "Hawaiian Escapade",   billed as Hawaiian Spy with Wilma and Betty as huge fans of the show, in particularly over its hunky lead star, Larry Lava; where they win to be on the set of the production shot on Hawaiirock's Rockiki Beach (a parody on Waikīkī Beach) in the show's promotional contest. 

The show was also parodied in Bob Clampett's cartoon series Beany And Cecil in an episode entitled "Hawaiian Eyeball."

Episode list
See List of Hawaiian Eye episodes

See also
Hawaii Five-O
Magnum, P.I.

References

External links

American Broadcasting Company original programming
1950s American crime television series
1960s American crime television series
1959 American television series debuts
1963 American television series endings
Television shows set in Hawaii
Television shows filmed in Los Angeles
Television series by Warner Bros. Television Studios
Black-and-white American television shows
American detective television series
English-language television shows
Fictional portrayals of the Honolulu Police Department